The Pittsburg State Gorillas, commonly referred to as Pitt State, are the athletic teams that represent Pittsburg State University. They are in the NCAA Division II as a member of the Mid-America Intercollegiate Athletics Association (MIAA). The Gorillas previously competed in the Central States Intercollegiate Conference (CSIC) of the National Association of Intercollegiate Athletics (NAIA) from 1976–77 to 1988–89; in the Great Plains Athletic Conference (GPAC) from 1972–73 to 1975–76; in the Rocky Mountain Athletic Conference (RMAC) from 1968–69 to 1971–72; in the Central Intercollegiate Athletic Conference (CIC) from 1923–24 to 1967–68; and in the Kansas Collegiate Athletic Conference (KCAC) from 1902–03 to 1922–23.

Varsity teams 
Pittsburg State competes in 12 intercollegiate varsity sports: Men's sports include baseball, basketball, cross country, football and track & field (indoor and outdoor); while women's sports include basketball, cross country, softball, track & field (indoor and outdoor) and volleyball. Club sports include men's baseball.

The Gorillas have won 5 NCAA national championships: 2 in football (1991, 2011), 1 in men's outdoor track and field (2022), 1 in men's indoor track and field (2018), and 1 in women's outdoor track & field (2016).

Football

The Pitt State football program began in 1908 under head coach Albert McLeland. Since that time, the program has produced the most wins in NCAA Division II history. It has been National Champions on four occasions; 1957, 1961, 1991 and 2011. Pittsburg State defeated Wayne State University, MI, 35-21 to claim its most recent national championship in 2011. During the 2004 season, the Gorillas finished 14–1, losing 31–36 to Valdosta State University in the NCAA Division II National Football Championship. Pittsburg State has won, outright or shared, a total of 27 conference championships during the 96-year history of its intercollegiate program, including 13 conference titles in the last 19 seasons under Coach Chuck Broyles PSU reached the Division II National Championship game in 2004, 1995, and 1992. Its games with fellow MIAA Division II powerhouse Northwest Missouri State University were played at Arrowhead Stadium in Kansas City, Missouri, in the Fall Classic at Arrowhead from 2002 until 2013. 26,695 attended the 2002 game—the most of any Division II game.

Mascot
The official mascot of Pitt State Athletic teams is Gus the Gorilla, designed in by L. Michael Hailey in 1985. Pitt State is the only college in the nation with the Gorilla as its official mascot for its men's and women's teams.

Notable alumni

 John Brown, NFL wide receiver, Buffalo Bills
 Eldon Danenhauer, Offensive tackle for the Denver Broncos.
 Ralph Earhart, former Green Bay Packers halfback
 Dennis Franchione, former head football coach of Texas State University (and former coach of Pittsburg State)
 Kendall Gammon, former Kansas City Chiefs longsnapper (currently employed by Pittsburg State)
 Don Gutteridge, Major League Baseball player and Manager
 Sherm Lollar, Major League Baseball player
 Ronald Moore, former NFL running back, 1992 Harlon Hill Trophy winner
 Brian Moorman, former NFL punter, Buffalo Bills
 Germaine Race, former NFL running back, San Diego Chargers

References

External links